The 1992 Missouri lieutenant gubernatorial election was held on November 3, 1992. Democratic nominee Roger B. Wilson defeated Republican nominee Margaret B. Kelly with 49.50% of the vote.

Primary elections
Primary elections were held on August 4, 1992.

Democratic primary

Candidates
Roger B. Wilson, State Senator
Mary Ross
Larry Rice
Prentess E. Clifton Sr.
Richard T. Bullet Train Pisani

Results

Republican primary

Candidates
Margaret B. Kelly, State Auditor of Missouri
Don Stubblefield
Jerry Malone Peters

Results

General election

Candidates
Major party candidates
Roger B. Wilson, Democratic
Margaret B. Kelly, Republican

Other candidates
Franklin M. Nugent, Libertarian

Results

References

1992
Missouri
Gubernatorial